Redemption: The Stan Tookie Williams Story is a 2004 American made-for-television biographical crime drama film starring Jamie Foxx, Lynn Whitfield,  Lee Thompson Young and CCH Pounder. The film was directed by Vondie Curtis-Hall and the screenplay was written by J.T. Allen. The film premiered at the 2004 Sundance Film Festival and was later broadcast on the FX network on April 11, 2004.

The film deals with the life of Stanley Tookie Williams, the co-founding member of the Crips street gang. Along with showing his life in the streets and his time in prison, it shows the work Williams did while incarcerated to help decrease gang violence in the world. The film was shot in 2003 while Williams was still imprisoned. On December 13, 2005, Williams was executed by lethal injection in California.

Cast

Production

Development 
During Williams' incarceration, he began co-writing a series of books with Barbara Becnel for young children about the dangers of gang violence. The first volumes of these books were published in 1996 by a small New York company. A quote from one of books which focuses on how gangs abuse power states, "... As a teenager, I didn't know the meaning of power. I thought that by using violence to scare people, I was proving that I had a lot of power. But when you use your power to make someone do something they don't want to do, or to hurt someone, you are abusing your power." 

The books generated enough publicity that in 2000, a member of Switzerland's national parliament nominated Williams for the Nobel Prize. Shortly after, a biopic of Williams was pitched to FX. Producer Rudy Langlais signed on to develop the project, saying Williams "struck [him] as a man in the midst of sort of reinventing himself...wrestling with past and future, becoming aware he is one step away from extinction." The production took on a sense of "emotional urgency" in September 2002 when the federal appeals court rejected Williams' appeal against the death penalty and suggested his sentence be reduced to life in prison instead.

Filming 
The film was shot in 38 days during July and August 2003. All of the filming took place in Toronto, except for one full day in South Central Los Angeles and one half-day of exteriors in San Francisco. The Toronto water treatment plant was used as a double for the exterior of San Quentin State Prison. A scheduling crisis emerged as Foxx had signed on to do the Michael Mann Collateral, which was due to begin filming soon. Though Foxx had the option of dropping out of Redemption, he chose to stay on and the shooting schedule was compressed to accommodate for him. 

Foxx spent many hours visiting with Williams at San Quentin and continued to correspond with him after filming ended. Said Foxx, "I gave him my word I was going to take care of this story. I had to do this project....I know I'm going to be successful, but with projects like this it's not the money you make, it's having the chance to touch, to get a chance to inspire. Especially for black folks....If we can get some education about some of the things we go through, it's worth more than any amount of money."  

Foxx's dialogue coach during the shoot was a former inmate of San Quentin.

Release 
The film premiered at the Sundance Film Festival on January 21, 2004. It was later aired on the FX cable network on April 11, 2004 and became a successful venture for the network.

Critical reception 
While Jamie Foxx's performance was lauded, with The New York Times' Alessandra Stanley saying he plays Williams "with iron-cast reserve, quietly conveying the authoritative presence of the man", critics said the story was limited by its made-for-TV format. Stanley said the film "is not interested in exploring uncomfortable, contradictory truths."

Accolades 
The film was the winner of five Black Reel Awards in the Network/Cable Television category, including Best Actor and Best Actress for Foxx and Lynn Whitfield, Best Supporting Actress for CCH Pounder, Best Director for Vondie Curtis-Hall, and Best Screenplay by J.T. Allen. Allen was nominated for a Writers Guild of America Award, and Foxx and Whitfield also won NAACP Image Awards for their performances.

At the 20th Independent Spirit Awards, Foxx was nominated for Best Male Lead and David Greene was nominated for Best Cinematography. Foxx also garnered nominations from the Screen Actors Guild Awards and the Golden Globe Awards.

References

External links
 
 

2004 crime drama films
2004 television films
2004 films
Films set in San Quentin State Prison
Films directed by Vondie Curtis-Hall
Films scored by Terence Blanchard
Biographical films about criminals
Biographical films about gangsters
Biographical films about writers
Films about capital punishment
Films about organized crime in the United States
Hood films
Films shot in Ontario
FX Networks original films
2004 independent films
American television films
American crime drama films
American gangster films
2000s American films